This is a list of plantations and/or plantation houses in the U.S. state of Alabama that are National Historic Landmarks, listed on the National Register of Historic Places, listed on the Alabama Register of Landmarks and Heritage, or are otherwise significant for their history, association with significant events or people, or their architecture and design.

A 2014 article listed numerous plantation houses that were endangered or had already been lost.

See also

History of slavery in Alabama
List of plantations in the United States

References

Plantations
Alabama